Claudio Nieto Jiménez (born September 24, 1977) is a Chilean ski mountaineer and triathlete.

Nieto was born in Santiago de Chile. As a military officer in the ran of a Capitán, he serves as a skiing instructor and high mountain guide in the Chilean Army. Currently he studies civil engineering at Academia Politécnica Militar, the polytechnic academie of the national military forces. He also coaches the national ski mountaineering selection.

In 2007, he participated at the 2007 South American Ski Mountaineering Championship, and won Silver.

References

External links 
 Claudio Nieto at SkiMountaineering.org

1976 births
Living people
Chilean male ski mountaineers
Ski mountaineering coaches
Chilean male triathletes
Chilean Army officers
Sportspeople from Santiago
21st-century Chilean people